Greg Oldfield (born 10 February 1995) is a South African first-class cricketer. He was part of South Africa's squad for the 2014 ICC Under-19 Cricket World Cup.

References

External links
 

1995 births
Living people
South African cricketers
Place of birth missing (living people)